Judge Gallagher may refer to:

Gordon Gallagher (fl. 1990s–2020s), magistrate judge of the United States District Court for the District of Colorado
John M. Gallagher (born 1966), judge of the United States District Court for the Eastern District of Pennsylvania
Stephanie A. Gallagher (born 1972), judge of the United States District Court for the District of Maryland

See also
Justice Gallagher (disambiguation)